Saguenay–Lac-Saint-Jean is a region in Quebec, Canada. It contains the Saguenay Fjord, the estuary of the Saguenay River, stretching through much of the region. It is also known as Sagamie in French, from the first part of "Saguenay" and the last part of "Piekouagami", the Innu name (meaning "flat lake") for Lac Saint-Jean, with the final "e" added to follow the model of other existing region names such as Mauricie, Témiscamie, Jamésie, and Matawinie. With a land area of 98,712.71 km2 (38,113.9 sq mi), the Saguenay–Lac-Saint-Jean is, after the Nord-du-Québec and Côte-Nord regions, the third-largest of Quebec regions in the area.

This region is bathed by two major watercourses, Lac Saint-Jean and the Saguenay River, both of which mark its landscape deeply and have been the main drives of its development in history. It is also irrigated by several other large watercourses. Bordered by forests and mountainous massifs, the southern portion of the region constitutes a fertile enclave in the Canadian Shield called the Saguenay Graben. Both the scenery and the cultural sites and activities of Saguenay–Lac-Saint-Jean attract tourists every year. Lac Saint-Jean is a popular vacation destination in the summer for residents of the more urban regions of Quebec.

Etymology
The name Saguenay is possibly derived from the Innu word "Saki-nip" which means "where water flows out".

Population
The population of the Saguenay–Lac-Saint-Jean region was 275,552 at the Canada 2021 Census, representing 3.2% of Quebec's population. It is concentrated primarily in three clusters: the city of Saguenay (pop. 144,723), the city of Alma (pop. 30,331) and the agglomeration of Roberval (pop. 9,840), Saint-Félicien (pop. 10,089) and Dolbeau-Mistassini (pop. 13,718). Saguenay, the region's largest city, is located slightly west of the fjord, mostly south of the river. It makes up 52.5% of the region's population.

Flag
The flag was incorporated in 1938 on the centenary of the first settlers' arrival in 1838 and was created by Mgr. Victor Tremblay, a local historian. The four colours represent the four elements of the richness of Saguenay: the grey cross represents aluminum, which is an important product of local industry; the red border represents the inhabitants' labour; green, at the top represents the forest; and yellow, at the bottom, represents agriculture.

Administrative divisions
Following the Saguenay municipal reorganization in 2002, the region now counts 49 municipalities (including unorganized territories).

Regional county municipalities
 Le Fjord-du-Saguenay Regional County Municipality (pop. 21,600)
 Lac-Saint-Jean-Est Regional County Municipality (pop. 52,741)
 Le Domaine-du-Roy Regional County Municipality (pop. 31,285)
 Maria-Chapdelaine Regional County Municipality (pop. 24,793)

Equivalent territory
 Saguenay (pop. 144,746)

Native reserve
 Mashteuiatsh within Le Domaine-du-Roy, (pop. 2,213 Montagnais)

Demographics 

The median age is 47.2, as opposed to 41.6 for all of Canada. French was the mother tongue of 98.0% of residents in 2021. The next most common mother tongues were English at 0.6%, followed by Spanish at 0.4% and the related languages of Atikamekw and Innu at 0.3% total. 0.4% reported both English and French as their first language. Additionally there were 0.1% who reported both French and a non-official language as their mother tongue.

As of 2021, Indigenous peoples comprised 5.1% of the population and visible minorities contributed 1.5%. The largest visible minority groups in Saguenay–Lac-Saint-Jean are Black (0.7%), Arab (0.2%), and Latin American (0.2%). The region is home to 555 recent immigrants (i.e. those arriving between 2016 and 2021). 190 of them come from France, and 180 come from various African countries, with Cameroon leading at 75 recent immigrants.

In 2021, 73.4% of the population identified as Catholic, while 19.2% said they had no religious affiliation. Muslims were the largest religious minority, making up 0.3% of the population.

Counting both single and multiple responses, the most commonly identified ethnocultural ancestries were:

(Percentages may total more than 100% due to rounding and multiple responses).

Major communities
 Albanel
 Alma
 Dolbeau-Mistassini
 Hébertville
 Métabetchouan-Lac-à-la-Croix
 Normandin
 Roberval Saguenay
 Saint-Ambroise
 Saint-Bruno
 Saint-David-de-Falardeau
 Saint-Félicien
 Saint-Honoré
 Saint-Prime

School districts
Each school service centre (French: centre de services scolaire) give services to five school distics of 20 in the region:
 Centre de services scolaire de la Jonquière
 Centre de services scolaire du Lac-Saint-Jean
 Centre de services scolaire du Pays-des-Bleuets (Maria-Chapdelaine, Le Domaine-du-Roy, Mashteuiatsh and Saint-Ludger-de-Milot)
 Centre de services scolaire des Rives-du-Saguenay (Le Fjord-du-Saguenay Regional County Municipality (except Larouche, Saint-Ambroise, Bégin), Sagard and Saguenay (except Jonquière)

The whole region is part of the anglophone district Central Quebec School Board.

See also
 List of Quebec regions
 List of people from Saguenay-Lac-Saint-Jean
 List of historic places in Saguenay-Lac-Saint-Jean

Notes

References

External links

Portail du Saguenay-Lac-Saint-Jean Official website
saguenay lac st jean Tourisme Alma

 
Administrative regions of Quebec